Hellboy II: The Golden Army is a 2008 American superhero film based on the Dark Horse Comics character Hellboy created by Mike Mignola. A sequel to Hellboy (2004), it is the second installment in the franchise's live-action film series. Directed and written by Guillermo del Toro from a story he co-wrote with Mignola, the film stars Ron Perlman as Hellboy, alongside Selma Blair, Doug Jones, Jeffrey Tambor, and John Hurt. In the film, Hellboy and the Bureau of Paranormal Research and Defense must battle a mythical prince who plans to reclaim the world for his magical kindred.

Hellboy II: The Golden Army was released in the United States on July 11, 2008, by Universal Pictures. The film received generally positive reviews from critics, who praised its fantasy atmosphere, as well as Perlman and the other cast's acting performances. It grossed over $168 million against a production budget between $82.5–85 million. The film received a nomination for Best Makeup at the 81st Academy Awards.

The film was followed by a reboot, simply titled Hellboy, released in 2019 by Lionsgate.

Plot
During Christmas 1955, a young Hellboy is told a bedtime story by his adoptive father, Trevor Bruttenholm, of an ancient war between human and magical creatures. After the magical creatures are driven back by the humans, the goblin blacksmiths extend an offer to Balor, king of the elves, to build him an indestructible mechanical army. Encouraged by his son Prince Nuada, Balor accepts; the Golden Army subsequently devastates humanity. Regretting his actions, Balor forms a truce with the humans, that they will keep to the cities and the magical creatures to the forests. The crown to command the Golden Army, which can only be worn by one of royal blood, is split into three pieces. Nuada, disagreeing with the truce, leaves in exile.

In the present, a year after the evil sorcerer Grigori Rasputin's plans to summon his eldritch masters, the Ogdru Jahad, to enact Armageddon were foiled, Nuada returns and begins gathering the pieces of the crown. He collects the first piece from an auction, unleashing tooth fairies, voracious flying creatures that eat the crowd alive, and kills his father for the second piece. His twin sister Princess Nuala escapes with the final piece.

Meanwhile, at the B.P.R.D., demonic special agent Hellboy is having issues with his girlfriend Liz, and dislikes that their organization must operate in secrecy. Investigating the auction slaughter, Hellboy allows himself to be revealed to the world. In the commotion, Abe Sapien discovers Liz is pregnant but she swears him to secrecy.

Furious at Hellboy's actions, Tom Manning's superiors send the ectoplasmic medium Johann Krauss to rein him in. With Krauss in charge, the team tracks the tooth fairies to a secret market under the Brooklyn Bridge. Abe finds Nuala, who has obtained a map leading to the Golden Army, and falls in love with her. Hellboy fights and kills Nuada's accomplice Wink and an elemental forest god that Nuada summons against him. During the fight, Nuada questions why he fights for the humans when they have driven the magical creatures into hiding, of which he, too, is one. Nuala is taken under the B.P.R.D.'s protection.

Nuada tracks his sister to the B.P.R.D. headquarters using their magical bond, which causes them to share wounds and read each other's thoughts. Nuala hides the final crown piece before Nuada finds her, and he battles Hellboy. Nuada critically wounds Hellboy with his spear and abducts Nuala, promising her return in exchange for the crown piece. Unable to remove the spear shard in his wound, Liz and Abe decide to take Hellboy to the Golden Army's location in the Giant's Causeway in Northern Ireland. Krauss comes along, as he sympathizes with Liz, revealing that he, too, lost his wife in the accident that caused the loss of his own body.

They encounter the Bethmoora goblin master blacksmith who brings them before the Angel of Death to retrieve the spear shard. Though warned that Hellboy will doom humanity if he lives and that she will suffer the most from it, Liz pleads for Hellboy's life. The Angel removes the shard from Hellboy's chest and tells Liz to give him a reason to live. She reveals to Hellboy that he will be a father and he recovers.

The goblin leads the team to the resting place of the Golden Army, where Nuada awaits them. Abe gives him the last piece of the crown, and Nuada awakens the Golden Army and commands them to kill the team. Hellboy challenges Nuada for the right to command the army; as Hellboy is a member of Hell's royal family, Nuada must accept the challenge. Hellboy defeats Nuada and spares his life, but Nuada tries stabbing him. Nuala commits suicide to stop her brother; the dying Nuada tells Hellboy he will have to choose whether humanity or magical beings must die. Abe psychically shares his feelings with Nuala before she dies. Liz uses her pyrokinesis to melt the crown, deactivating the Golden Army.

Hellboy, Liz, Abe, and Johann resign from the B.P.R.D., and Hellboy contemplates his future life with Liz and their baby. Liz corrects "babies", revealing that she is pregnant with twins.

Cast

 Ron Perlman as Hellboy: An immensely powerful demon who works for the government organization Bureau for Paranormal Research and Defense (B.P.R.D.). Guillermo del Toro described the character's dilemma in the sequel, "[He] has always fought on the side of humans, but this [fantasy of destruction] pushes his buttons to reconsider." In the sequel, Hellboy is armed with an enormous new gun called "The Big Baby", which fires flare-like bullets. Montse Ribé plays a young version of Hellboy in an opening flashback.
 Selma Blair as Liz Sherman: A pyrokinetic member of B.P.R.D. and Hellboy's girlfriend. Blair described her character as more engaging in the sequel, "In the first one she was afraid to take a step. She was completely a zombie, not wanting to own up to her power and having the memory of what she'd created in her life... I was really eager to come and play Liz with a little more vibrancy." Blair also had short hair for her role, avoiding long hair from her portrayal in the first film, which she felt "brought her face down". The actress emphasized Liz Sherman's growth in the sequel, "She's looking to the future much more, and things are happening in this one that she has to buck up... I think you're dealing with a lot knowing this young girl that we last saw as very damaged, and now she's with this guy, and all these people around her, I think, we've really had to step up a strength, and a confidence in her so that I don't look like the little baby kid sister tagging along."
 Doug Jones as three characters:
 Abe Sapien: An ichthyo sapien empath who works for B.P.R.D. with Hellboy. Jones said of his return to the role after the first film, "He's been an absolute treat for me to play this time. He's written with so many different colours and levels and there's a love interest... And his buddy time with Hellboy is more concrete and his brother/sister time with Liz is even better." Jones believed that Abe Sapien became "the brains, the intellect of the team" while Hellboy protects his character because he is still "kind of innocent". The actor pointed to his character's adolescence with love, "His love life is something that's never been tapped into before... So just like a 13-year-old with his first crush, this is how you're going to see Abe this time. A portion of him. Will this affect his decision-making powers?" Unlike the first movie, where Abe's voice was dubbed by David Hyde Pierce, Doug Jones provided the voice himself.
 Angel of Death: A female angel with androgynous characteristics. Jones explained his portrayal, "The script refers to the angel as a her and that's what I do. I think she has feminine qualities, but she's not totally a woman either. And that's okay. I like characters that keep you guessing."
 Chamberlain: The door keeper for King Balor. The creature is long, gangly, eight feet tall and wears silk and velvet robes. It also has long, spindly fingers, which filmmakers mobilized with servos and which Jones wore as extensions of his own hands.
 John Alexander and James Dodd as Johann Krauss: Krauss is a German psychic whose ectoplasmic being is contained in a suit after a botched séance. Originally, filmmakers planned to create a computer-generated version of the glass fishbowl helmet, but with the cost being prohibitive, they created an actual helmet. To ensure the invisibility of the actor's head under the glass, perspective and mirror tricks were used. The helmet was controlled by two puppeteers, so the heavy contraption had to be shared between Alexander and Dodd.
 Seth MacFarlane voices Johann Krauss, having taken over from Thomas Kretschmann, after del Toro decided that Kretschmann's voice and the mechanical sound effects to Johann's suit did not mesh well.
 John Alexander also performs and voices the Bethmoora Goblin, a legless goblin who helps Hellboy and the team find the Angel of Death. He is the master goblin blacksmith who forged the Golden Army and lost his original legs in the process.
 Luke Goss as Prince Nuada Silverlance: King Balor's son and a martial arts expert of extraordinary proficiency. Goss was previously cast as mutant vampire Jared Nomak in del Toro's 2002 film Blade II, and the director approached the actor to be cast in Hellboy II. The only other actor considered for the part was Charlie Hunnam. Goss trained with action director and former Jackie Chan Stunt Team member, Brad Allan, learning sword and spear skills for six to seven months for his role. He and Anna Walton also learned ancient Gaelic from a dialog coach for their lines. Goss did not perceive Nuada as evil, explaining, "It's issues, his people, he's part of what he truly believes. I don't think, really, he's so deluded... [He] is driven by an ethic that was instilled by the person he has problems [with; that is,] his father, and inevitably, that leads into the conflict with him and Hellboy." Goss also noted that his character admired and revered his twin sister, portrayed by Anna Walton. He said of the prince and the princess, "There is an incestuous relationship that's not maybe overly obvious to everybody, but some people hopefully will pick up on the fact, certainly from my direction towards her."
 Anna Walton as Princess Nuala: King Balor's daughter and Nuada's twin sister. She is described as "very light" while Nuada is "very dark", creating a yin and yang dynamic. She elaborated on the incestuous tones between her character and Prince Nuada, "He's the dark side and she's the light side and they're pulled apart and pulled back together again, and she's trying to get away because she knows there is something she has to do. He can't let that go and they can't really do anything without each other so it's a really interesting thing." Her character also forms a relationship with Abe Sapien, and Walton noted their similarities, "They are both slightly lost souls and they understand each other." Walton spoke of her character's sense of purpose, "She feels very strongly about what she has to do in the film, and then her absolute connection and love for the Earth and what we are given. That's what she's here to protect... Her relationship with her brother, and how he is almost a part of her but she has to break away and will do whatever it takes to stop him from achieving what he wants to achieve, which is the mass destruction of mankind."
 Jeffrey Tambor as Tom Manning: Head of the B.P.R.D., he has a slightly antagonistic relationship with Hellboy.
 John Hurt as Trevor Bruttenholm: Hellboy's adoptive father, he is seen in the beginning of the film telling young Hellboy the story of the Golden Army.
 Brian Steele as four of the trolls:
 Mr. Wink: A giant cave troll who was originally conceived by Guillermo del Toro. Wink was sculpted by Mario Torres, and the costume was worn by Brian Steele. In the film, Wink's right arm has a giant metal fist. The fist was designed by filmmakers to be made of heavy plastic to stay light enough for motors to operate the mechanical fingers. The fist could also be physically detached and used as a projectile without any computer-generated imagery used. Several of Mike Mignola's comics characters wield similar mechanical fists on chains, including the Kriegaffes used by Herman von Klempt. Likewise, Mr. Wink has an old wound on the left side of his face that has closed one of his eyes. Del Toro said that he named Mr. Wink after Selma Blair's one-eyed dog (which Blair confirms in a commentary track for the DVD release).
 Cathedral Head: A troll who is the owner of a map shop who gives Princess Nuala the hidden map.
 Fragglewump: A monstrous Scottish troll that masquerades as a sweet old lady and feeds on kittens and fears canaries.
 Cronie Troll: A spice shop owner who gets in an argument with Hellboy in the troll market.
 Roy Dotrice as King Balor: The one-armed king of Elfland. All of his dialogue is in Gaelic.

Production
In May 2004, following the release of Guillermo del Toro's Hellboy the previous month, a sequel was announced by Revolution Studios with del Toro returning to direct and Ron Perlman reprising his lead role as the title character. The director sought to create a film trilogy with the first sequel anticipated for release in 2006. Revolution Studios planned to produce the film and distribute it through a deal with Columbia Pictures, but by 2006, their distribution deal wasn't renewed and Revolution began refocusing on exploiting their film library. In August 2006, Universal Pictures acquired the project with the intent to finance and distribute the sequel, which was newly scheduled to be released in summer of 2008. Production was scheduled to begin in April 2007 in Etyek, Hungary (near Budapest) and London, England.

Director Guillermo del Toro explored several concepts for the sequel, initially planning to recreate the classic versions of Frankenstein, Dracula and the Wolf Man. He and comic book creator Mike Mignola also spent a few days adapting the Almost Colossus story, featuring Roger the Homunculus. They then found it easier to create an original story based on folklore, because del Toro was planning Pan's Labyrinth, and Mignola's comics were becoming increasingly based on mythology. Later, del Toro pitched a premise to Revolution Studios that involved four Titans from the four corners of Earth—Wind, Water, Fire, and Earth—before he replaced the Titans with a Golden Army. Mignola described the theme of the sequel, "The focus is more on the folklore and fairy tale aspect of Hellboy. It's not Nazis, machines and mad scientists but the old gods and characters who have been kind of shoved out of our world."

Del Toro released Pan's Labyrinth in 2006, and the film earned multiple Academy Awards, providing the director enough clout to begin production on the film. Guillermo del Toro began filming the film in June 2007 in Budapest and concluded in December 2007. The film was the first American production to shoot at Korda Studios in Hungary, then newly built outside Budapest. The creature shop was led by the company Spectral Motion, and Filmefex contributed work in makeup and prosthetics. The latter company designed a creature for the troll market scene and built several statues and full-sized replicas of the Golden Army.

Music
 Eddy Arnold – "Santa Claus Is Coming to Town"
 Takako Nishizaki and Jenő Jandó – "Violin Sonata No. 9"
 Travis – "All I Want to Do Is Rock"
 Poet in Process – "Why"
 Brenga Astur – "Nel Caleyu La Fonte"
 Eels – "Beautiful Freak"
 Barry Manilow – "Can't Smile Without You"
 Red Is for Fire – "Noir"

Release
Hellboy II: The Golden Army opened on July 11, 2008, in 3,204 theaters in the United States and Canada. The film ranked first at the box office, grossing an estimated $35.9 million over the weekend, outperforming the opening of its predecessor, which had opened with $23.2 million. The opening was the biggest of Guillermo del Toro's directing career until 2013, when it was surpassed by Pacific Rim.

Audiences polled by CinemaScore, during the opening weekend, gave the film a 'B' grade. The demographic for the film was mostly male, and the age distribution for moviegoers below and above 25 years old was evenly split. Outside of the United States and Canada, the film had a limited release on 533 screens in Mexico, Thailand, Malaysia, and Singapore, grossing $4.6 million.

In its second weekend in the United States and Canada, the film's box office performance dropped 71% to gross $10.1 million, a larger drop than its predecessor, which dropped 53% in comparison. The sequel's larger drop was attributed to the significant opening of the Batman film The Dark Knight. As of September 9, 2008 the film has grossed $75,986,503 in the United States and Canada. The film came top in the UK and Ireland box office charts upon its release on August 22 and earned an additional international gross of $84,401,560 bringing its worldwide total to $160,388,063.

Marketing
In addition to television spots showing scenes from the film, humorous adverts were also aired depicting Hellboy appearing on Ghost Hunters; being interviewed by James Lipton on Inside the Actors Studio; playing video games with Chuck Bartowski from Chuck; visiting the set of American Gladiators; auditioning for a high school event; and hosting a public service announcement with a cat.

Home media 
Hellboy II: The Golden Army was released on DVD and Blu-ray on November 11, 2008. For the DVD, there is both a single-disc and a 3-disc special edition (not available in the UK).

The single-disc edition includes the movie and a very limited selection of special features. Available on the one-disc edition is a "Director's Notebook" section, in which pages of Del Toro's notebook are reproduced, showcasing design sketches and annotations by the director, as well as "video pod" segments in which he explains these designs and concepts further. The segment is available in the three-disc edition in the "pre-production vault", which also includes other galleries. The three-disc special edition includes two audio commentaries (one by Del Toro and another by members of the cast), six deleted scenes, several featurettes, a full-length documentary, and image galleries. Though not added into the movie after credits due to budget cuts, a comic style of the Zinco Sequel is added to the special features, serving as a prologue to the third Hellboy movie. The third disc contains a digital copy. Hellboy II: The Golden Army was released on 4K UHD Blu-Ray on May 7, 2019.

Reception

Critical response
The website's critical consensus reads, "Guillermo del Toro crafts a stellar comic book sequel, boasting visuals that are as imaginative as the characters are endearing." On Metacritic the film has a weighted average score of 78 out of 100, based on 36 reviews, indicating "generally favorable reviews". 

Roger Ebert of the Chicago Sun-Times gave the film three and a half stars out of four, the same rating he gave the first film, writing: "In every way the equal of del Toro's original Hellboy, although perhaps a little noisier, it's another celebration of his love for bizarre fantasy and diabolical machines." Michael Rechtshaffen writing in The Hollywood Reporter said Hellboy II was an uncompromised vision of del Toro's imagination. He said that with the director given free rein, the film came across as an amalgam of the best moments from his previous films, only with better visual effects. John Anderson of Variety wrote of a rococo precision to the visuals that exceeded that of the first film. He cited del Toro's "clockmaker's preoccupation with detail" and ability to blend state-of-the-art technology with more classical visuals as the reasons for the film's success. Owen Gleiberman of Entertainment Weekly said that the plot did not often deviate from its comic-book traditions, but that del Toro staged the action "brilliantly". He said that while the visual effects deserved recognition, what made the film so exciting was the personality they were imbued with. Chuck Wilson of The Village Voice said that del Toro was on autopilot, but that he and his Pan's Labyrinth crew, cinematographer Guillermo Navarro in particular, staged the steady stream of action set-pieces expertly. Mike Goodridge of Screen International wrote that del Toro had retained the B movie tone of the first film, saying the film managed to avoid the self-importance of The Incredible Hulk and the Batman film series and that del Toro was simply a "great storyteller" providing a "good time". Stuart Levine in Premiere praised the visuals and "beautiful" set-pieces, but said del Toro's script fell a little short of his direction. Alonso Duralde writing for msnbc.com said it represented a backwards step for del Toro, saying that despite several creepy sequences, the film was a return to the muddled storytelling and pretty visuals of his pre-Pan's Labyrinth films. He said del Toro's screenplay lacked energy or momentum. However, Peter Bradshaw, of The Guardian, said almost the opposite was the case, as he thinks "it is a crackingly enjoyable and exciting sequel, with something that the memory of Pan's Labyrinth might have entirely erased: a sense of humour." Noting that "this spectacular movie seethes and fizzes with wit and energy, absorbing and transforming influences such as Ghostbusters and even Harry Potter and the secret world of Diagon Alley."

John Anderson said the film would be "almost unthinkable" without Ron Perlman in the lead role, saying the film was more successful than its predecessor mainly due to the more deliberately amusing tone and the "drily ironic" title character. He said the only weak link was Luke Goss's "unimposing" villain. While praising the general banter between Perlman and Blair, Stuart Levine said the nonchalant Hellboy exhibited insufficient growth as a character, and that Jeffrey Tambor was largely wasted in his role. He agreed that Goss's villain was weak as written, with no tangible menace. Helen O'Hara of Empire said the character was only let down by a lack of screentime in which to give him enough dramatic weight, and that Goss did "a perfectly good job". Owen Gleiberman said Perlman was more assured than in the first Hellboy, funnier and more cantankerous. He said the entire ensemble had "an appealing, outsize grandeur" about it. Mike Goodridge said the film carefully developed the character relationships, and Chuck Wilson said that other than the title character's penchant for chewing cigars, he was otherwise "uninteresting". Alonso Duralde wrote that the "sitcom-ish" character dilemmas were uninteresting, saying that Perlman and Tambor's performances were regularly let down by the script. He said that Blair's performance was possibly the first bad one he'd seen by the actress, and that while Jones was "brilliant" physically, his vocal performance was inferior to David Hyde Pierce's in the first Hellboy film. Michael Rechtshaffen called Perlman "terrific" and said Blair's brooding portrayal was effective.

Michael Rechtshaffen concluded that Hellboy II was less focused than the first film, but that it played "faster and looser" and mostly a "wild ride". In a positive review, John Anderson's main criticism was a sequence set in Northern Ireland, which he called the least interesting and most conventional segment of the film. Chuck Wilson said the film "didn't have much on its mind", but that it would amaze children and amuse adults, Stuart Levine said the film was worth viewers' time, and Alonso Duralde said Hellboy II was "limp and unengaging". Owen Gleiberman surmised that the film was "derivative yet... dazzling", and Mike Goodridge concluded by praising the filmmakers' skill at creating a film that, despite featuring "stunning" action sequences and creature effects, still found time for character development and a fulfilling story that expanded the franchise's wider mythology. Peter Bradshaw suggested that "'Visionary' is a word too easily applied to fantasy movies, but it sticks easily here."

The film appeared on some critics' top ten lists of the best films of 2008. Rene Rodriguez of the Miami Herald named it the fifth-best film of 2008 (along with The Dark Knight), and Stephanie Zacharek of Salon named it the tenth-best film of 2008 (along with Iron Man).

Awards

Tie-in publications and merchandise

Short story 
Guillermo del Toro and Matthew Robbins co-authored the short story, "Tasty Teeth", which was published in the 2004 anthology Hellboy: Odder Jobs by Dark Horse Comics. In the story, Hellboy encounters tooth fairies in a tomb in Romania, featuring elements that were later incorporated into the auction house sequence in the film.

Promotional comic
This story by Mike Mignola and Guillermo del Toro with art by Francisco Ruiz Velasco was published as a special promotion for the film by Dark Horse Comics in one-shot comic book Hellboy: The Golden Army (January 2008) with three variant covers:
 Photo cover of Ron Perlman as Hellboy
 Photo cover of Doug Jones as Abe Sapien
 Photo cover of Selma Blair as Liz Sherman

In his introduction film director del Toro affirms his and Mignola's admiration of Velasco's "clean, propulsive narrative, draftsmanship, and artistic skills" and states that the intention of this title is to treat the film's opening narrative as a mini-epic and give the artist the opportunity to tell it with unlimited budget and shooting time.

In the story Professor Trevor Bruttenholm, caring for the young Hellboy at Douglas Air Force Base, New Mexico, on Christmas Eve 1944, relates the story of the Golden Army from the film's opening prologue, which he describes as the first tale ever told, as a bedtime story that he ends by saying one day Hellboy may find out if it is true.

Art book
Hellboy II: The Art of the Movie (June 18, 2008) by Guillermo del Toro and Mike Mignola with art by Sergio Sandoval and Francisco Ruiz Velasco looks into the film's evolution, from early concept art and diary sketches to photos of the final props, sets, and includes:
Complete screenplay including a deleted scene illustrated with the original storyboards
Interviews and commentary from creator Mike Mignola and filmmaker Guillermo del Toro

Novelization
Hellboy II: The Golden Army (June 18, 2008) by Robert Greenberger is the official novelization of the film.

Video game

During its initial theatrical release in North America, a video game set within the Hellboy universe was released around the time that of the film entitled Hellboy: The Science of Evil for PlayStation 3, PlayStation Portable and Xbox 360, released on June 24 in North America and August 15 in Europe. Despite its close release date, promotion alongside the film and featuring voices of the same actors, the game is not a direct movie tie-in with the plot not being related to that of the film but instead follows an original story where Hellboy investigates Nazi operations in Romania under Herman von Klempt, an antagonist from the comics.

Zinco epilogue
Included as a special feature on the DVD is an animated comic that foreshadows the events of the next film. In the Zinco Epilogue, a group of men go into Rasputin's tomb and find Kroenen's body. After bringing Kroenen to a doctor along with instructions to revive him with an alchemical manual, Zinco and his party travel to an arctic cave with Zinco as the only survivor. Upon entering the cavern, Zinco opens a container he has with him containing the preserved head of Kroenen and attaches it to a giant robot. As soon as it is attached, the cyborg awakens and the spirit of Rasputin appears, stating that he has one more job for him.

Post release

Cancelled sequel and spin-offs
Del Toro had expressed interest in a sequel, saying, "I think we would all come back to do a third Hellboy, if they can wait for me to get out of Middle-Earth, but we don't know. Ron may want to do it sooner, but I certainly know where we're going with the movie on the third one." On May 30, 2010, Guillermo del Toro dropped out of directing The Hobbit.

In June 2010, Del Toro speculated that Hellboy III might happen after his next project, but said that the screenplay had yet to be written.

On July 14, 2012, after being inspired by a recent Make-A-Wish function in which Ron Perlman appeared in full Hellboy makeup for a terminally ill boy, Del Toro stated, "I can say publicly that now we are together in trying [to do Hellboy 3]".

On April 5, 2013, in an interview with Comic Book Resources, Hellboy creator Mike Mignola commented that the possibility of a third Hellboy film seemed unlikely, stating "The biggest problem I see as far as PR for the next billion years is explaining endlessly ... that there's no Hellboy 3 movie".

On June 30, 2013, del Toro discussed the possibility of developing Hellboy 3 at Legendary Pictures. He stated: "I hate giving pieces about it, but last night, we were at dinner and Ron said, 'I would be very happy to do Hellboy again, when are we doing Hellboy 3? Thomas Tull said, 'I would love to see Hellboy 3.' He didn't say he would love to do it he just said he'd like to see it, but today, I'll ask him." Ron Perlman added his support for the idea, stating: "Not just anybody can make this movie. I loved working for Legendary and I know for Guillermo working on Pacific Rim was one of his greatest experiences. The reason I loved working for them is because Guillermo was so happy. I came in six months into the shoot and he seemed as fresh as a daisy, simply because he was working for someone who appreciated and supported his outlandish visions of what he wanted to put on the screen. My immediate, silent wish was, wouldn't it be great if these guys came in and helped resolve the Hellboy series."

Del Toro suggested telling the story of Hellboy 3 in comic book form, but Mignola vetoed the idea.

On June 30, 2013, in an interview, Ron Perlman spoke about Hellboy 3 saying, "[Hellboy 3] needs to be twice as big as Hellboy 1 or Hellboy 2. It's all of these oracles coming home to roost with these apocalyptic things taking place, Guillermo's version of this resolve in the trilogy is epic in scope. Not just anybody can make this movie. It has to be somebody who's no stranger to this sense of scope. For me to do Hellboy 3, it could kill me—in terms of physically demanding, for a guy my age, but it's worth it because anyone who sits and listens to Guillermo's version of how this thing ends is completely seduced. It's so theatrical and compelling and if you liked the first two movies in any way, shape or form, this is the ultimate one-two punch."

On July 11, 2014, in a Reddit AMA, Del Toro said, "Well, you know, we don't have that movie on the horizon, but the idea for it was to have Hellboy finally come to terms with the fact that his destiny, his inevitable destiny, is to become the beast of the Apocalypse, and having him and Liz face the sort of, that part of his nature, and he has to do it, in order to be able to ironically vanquish the foe that he has to face in the 3rd film. He has to become the beast of the Apocalypse to be able to defend humanity, but at the same time he becomes a much darker being. It's a very interesting ending to the series, but I don't think it will happen. ... We have gone through basically every studio and asked for financing, and they are not interested. I think that the first movie made its budget back, and a little bit of profit, but then it was very very big on video and DVD. The story repeated itself with the second already, it made its money back at the box office, but a small margin of profit in the release of the theatrical print, but was very very big on DVD and video. Sadly now from a business point of view all the studios know is that you don't have that safety net of the DVD and video, so they view the project as dangerous."

In July 2015, del Toro said that Legendary Pictures might fund Hellboy 3 if Pacific Rim: Uprising does well at the box office: "The hard fact is that the movie's going to need about $120 million and there's nobody knocking down our doors to give it to us. It's a little beyond Kickstarter." After del Toro left the director's chair for Pacific Rim: Uprising, the deal fell through.

In February 2017, Del Toro announced via Twitter, "Must report that 100% [Hellboy 3] will not happen."

In July 2019, Perlman said that he would still love to finish the trilogy with del Toro, ignoring the reboot, and that he thought it could happen if financing could be found. In January 2022, Perlman encouraged Del Toro to proceed with the sequel, saying that they owed it to the fans to get it done and that "it would be an epic conclusion."

In 2010, Hellboy screenwriter Peter Briggs was asked by Universal to script a spin-off centring on Prince Nuada, and provisionally agreed that Briggs could direct the film in New Zealand. Briggs began work on an outline with co-writer Aaron Mason. Titled Hellboy: Silverlance, the script was a B.P.R.D. story featuring Abe Sapien as the main character with Hellboy in a supporting role. Moving into the new B.P.R.D. headquarters in Colorado, Abe is troubled by his psychic connection with Princess Nuala, and begins researching the elves' history. The film would have shown Nuada's adventures throughout history, including his rivalry with a fairy courtier who orchestrates Nuada's exile in hopes of marrying Nuala and seizing control of the fairy kingdom; Nuada first meeting Mister Wink by saving him from a troupe of soldiers during the Spanish Inquisition; and Nuada in Nazi Germany, engineering a pact to keep various supernatural entities safe during World War II (with Nuada and Kroenen fighting in a "friendly" match for Project Ragnarok men.) Doug Jones would have played both Abe and the Angel of Death, who strikes a bargain with Nuada. Rupert Evans's Agent Myers would also have returned. The story climaxed at the new B.P.R.D. headquarters, with the return of Rasputin's summoning gauntlet. Universal wanted to proceed with the project, but it emerged that del Toro's Hellboy 3 was still a possibility, so Silverlance was shelved.

In 2015, Briggs received another call from Universal, saying that Hellboy 3 had been cancelled and asking him and Mason to return for a reworked Silverlance, with producer Lawrence Gordon involved. The caveat was that Hellboy could not appear, but the writers managed to get the character a cameo appearance at the climax. If successful, the film would have launched a From the Files of the B.P.R.D. spin-off series.

In May 2017, Briggs affirmed that, with the announcement of the Hellboy reboot, the Silverlance project was dead.

Reboots

About 2014, Mignola, writer Andrew Cosby, and the producers began work on the story for a new film. The project was initially intended as a sequel to del Toro's films, but Perlman was unwilling to star without del Toro involved. When Neil Marshall joined, it was decided that the new film would be a reboot.

On May 8, 2017, it was announced that Millennium Films was in negotiations with producers Larry Gordon and Lloyd Levin for a film with the working title Hellboy: Rise of the Blood Queen, with Marshall is in talks to direct and Stranger Things star David Harbour expected to play Hellboy. Hellboy creator Mike Mignola co-wrote the script with Cosby and Christopher Golden. On August 8, 2017, Lionsgate confirmed that the project would finally only be known as Hellboy. The film was released on April 12, 2019 to negative reviews and performed poorly at the box office.

In February 2023, Millennium Media announced plans for a new live-action reboot titled Hellboy: The Crooked Man, the first in a potential series of films. Production is scheduled to begin in March 2023 in Bulgaria with Brian Taylor directing from a script by Mignola and Golden, based on the 2008 comic of the same name. The film is to be co-produced between Nu Boyana and Campbell Grobman Film and is presented by Millennium Media in association with Dark Horse Entertainment.

References

Further reading

External links

 
 
 
 
 
 
 From mind to movie - how the world of Hellboy II was created - Extrageographic 

Hellboy films
2008 films
2000s fantasy action films
2000s monster movies
2000s pregnancy films
2000s superhero films
American superhero films
American fantasy action films
American pregnancy films
American sequel films
Apocalyptic films
Films based on Celtic mythology
Dark Horse Entertainment films
Goblin films
Demons in film
Patricide in fiction
Films about elves
Films produced by Lawrence Gordon
Films scored by Danny Elfman
Films set in 1955
Films set in 2008
Films set in New York City
Films set in Northern Ireland
Films shot in Budapest
Films shot in Hungary
Films shot in London
Films shot in Northern Ireland
Films directed by Guillermo del Toro
Live-action films based on comics
Relativity Media films
Films with screenplays by Guillermo del Toro
Films with screenplays by Mike Mignola
Universal Pictures films
Steampunk films
2000s English-language films
2000s American films